The Sun Odyssey 40 is a French sailboat that was designed by Daniel Andrieu as a cruiser and first built in 1998.

The boat uses the same hull design as the Sun Odyssey 40 DS and the 2004 Sun Odyssey 40.3.

Production
The design was built by Jeanneau in France, from 1998 until 2004, but it is now out of production.

Design
The Sun Odyssey 40 is a recreational keelboat, built predominantly of vinylester fiberglass, with wood trim. The hull is solid fiberglass, while the deck is balsa-cored, all with a ISO 9002 gelcoat. It has a masthead sloop rig with anodized aluminum spars, a raked stem, a reverse transom with a swimming platform, an internally mounted spade-type rudder controlled by dual wheels and a fixed fin keel or optional shoal-draft keel. The fin keel model displaces  and carries  of ballast, while the shoal draft keel version displaces carries  of ballast.

The design was built in three different interior layouts: a two-cabin arrangement with a forward owner's cabin plus an aft cabin, a three cabin layout with two heads and a three cabin layout with one head. The interior is finished in Burmese teak.

For sailing downwind the design may be equipped with a symmetrical spinnaker.

The boat has a PHRF handicap of 90 to 114.

See also
List of sailing boat types

References

External links

Keelboats
1990s sailboat type designs
Sailing yachts
Sailboat type designs by Daniel Andrieu
Sailboat types built by Jeanneau